Calf Sound is a body of water which separates the Calf of Man island from the mainland of the Isle of Man. The sound - technically a strait - is about 700 yards in width, and contains the small islet of Kitterland, which is home to a large colony of seals.

The name ‘calf’ comes from the Old Norse word ‘kalfr’ which means a small island close to a larger one.

A visitor centre overlooking the Calf Sound holds multimedia exhibits giving information about the wildlife and history of the area. The centre, operated by Manx National Heritage also includes a café with both indoor and outdoor seating. The building erected to house the visitor centre was designed to have little visual impact when looking towards the Calf of Man, partially achieved by covering the roof with turf.

There is car parking available and an hourly bus service from Port Erin terminates here.

References

Bodies of water of the Isle of Man
Straits of the British Isles
Sounds of the United Kingdom